Saifuddin Hamza Shah was the fourth Sultan of the first Ilyas dynasty of Bengal reigning from 1410 to 1412.

Early life and background
Hamza was born in the 14th-century into a ruling class Bengali Muslim Sunni family known as the Ilyas Shahi dynasty, in the Bengal Sultanate. His father, Sultan Ghiyasuddin Azam Shah, was the grandson of Shamsuddin Ilyas Shah – the founder of the ruling dynasty as well as the nation. Hailing from what is now eastern Iran and southern Afghanistan, Hamza's family was of Sistani ancestral origin.

Reign

The reasoning behind the death of Hamza's father, Sultan Ghiyasuddin Azam Shah, is contested between a natural death or an assassination plotted by Raja Ganesha, the Hindu zamindar of Bhaturia who gained prominence in the Sultanate court.

Following the death, Hamza assumed the throne with the grand title of "Sultan-us-Salatin", meaning Sultan of Sultans, in 1420 CE with the support of the court nobles. He began minting coins in his name from cities such as Satgaon, Muazzamabad and Firuzabad. Hamza also maintained a good relationship with the Yongle Emperor of Ming China, and had an heir named Muhammad bin Hamzah.

Death
Hamza's reign was interrupted by a nationwide civil war instigated by Raja Ganesha. According to the Egyptian scholars Ibn Hajar al-Asqalani and Al-Sakhawi who were alive at the time of receiving the news, Sultan Hamza Shah was murdered by his slave Mamluk Shihab in 1412.

The 20th-century Indian historian R. C. Majumdar however, believes that Shihab was Hamza's son and did not kill Hamza but rather succeeded him after his assassination.

See also
List of rulers of Bengal
History of Bengal
History of Bangladesh

References

1412 deaths
Sunni Muslims
15th-century Indian Muslims
14th-century births
15th-century Indian monarchs
Ilyas Shahi dynasty